Roland Lake is a lake in Douglas County, in the U.S. state of Minnesota.

Roland Lake was named for John Roland, a pioneer settler.

See also
List of lakes in Minnesota

References

Lakes of Minnesota
Lakes of Douglas County, Minnesota